Los Guido is a district of the Desamparados canton, in the San José province of Costa Rica.

History 
Los Guido was created on 1 September 2003 by Decreto 31380-G .

Geography 
Los Guido has an area of  km2 and an elevation of  metres.

Demographics 

For the 2011 census, Los Guido had a population of  inhabitants.

References 

Districts of San José Province
Populated places in San José Province